Manatí, Puerto Rico is a municipality of Puerto Rico on the northern coast.

Manatí may also refer to:

Manatí, Atlántico, a municipality in Atlántico Department, Colombia
Manatí, Cuba, a municipality in Las Tunas Province, Cuba

See also